This is a list of Sheriffs of Worcester County, Massachusetts.  The Sheriff originally was an appointed office, it has been an elected position since 1856.   The Sheriff is elected to serve a six-year term.

The current Worcester County Sheriff is Lewis Evangelidis

Government in Worcester County, Massachusetts

Massachusetts, Worcester
Sheriffs of Worcester County, Massachusetts